Charlotte Amalie, located on St. Thomas, is the capital and the largest city of the United States Virgin Islands. It was founded in 1666 as Taphus (meaning 'beer house' or 'beer hall' in Danish). In 1691, the town was renamed to Charlotte Amalie after Charlotte Amalie of Hesse-Kassel (1650–1714), queen consort to King Christian V of Denmark-Norway. It has a deep-water harbor that was once a haven for pirates and is now one of the busiest ports of call for cruise ships in the Caribbean, with about 1.5 million-plus cruise ship passengers landing there annually. Protected by Hassel Island, the harbor has docking and fueling facilities, machine shops, and shipyards and was a U.S. submarine base until 1966. The Town has been inhabited for centuries. When Christopher Columbus arrived in 1493, the area was inhabited by Caribs, Arawaks, Ciboney and Taíno native peoples. It is on the southern shore at the head of Saint Thomas Harbor. In 2010 the City had a population of 18,481, which makes it the largest city in the Virgin Islands Archipelago. Hundreds of ferries and yachts pass by the Town each week.

The City is known for its Danish colonial architecture, building structure and history.  Dozens of streets and places throughout the City have Danish names. Charlotte Amalie has buildings of historical importance including St. Thomas Synagogue, the second oldest synagogue in the United States, and Frederick Lutheran Church. The Town has a long history of pirates, especially myths of Bluebeard, and facts and stories of Blackbeard (Edward Teach). In the 17th century, the Danes built both Blackbeard's Castle and Bluebeard's Castle attributed to the pirates. Blackbeard's Castle is a U.S. National Historic Landmark. Another tourist attraction is Fort Christian, the oldest standing structure in the Virgin Islands Archipelago. A copy of the Liberty Bell  and freed slave blowing a conch shell are in Emancipation Park, which is both a source of national pride and a tourist attraction.

Name 

Before the time of the Danish West Indies (1754–1917), the City was known as Taphus for its many beer halls. Taphus is Danish and directly translates to 'beer house', 'beer hall', or (most literally) 'tap house'. In 1691 the Town received a more respectable name by being named Charlotte Amalie in honor of Danish King Christian V's wife, Charlotte Amalie of Hesse-Kassel (1650–1714). Between 1921 and 1936, the city was called St. Thomas by the United States. In 1936 the capital was recognized as Charlotte Amalie.

History

Early history
On his second voyage to the New World, Christopher Columbus encountered Native Americans living in the present-day archipelago of the United States Virgin Islands. Archaeological records indicate that the islands have been home to native american people groups, including the Taíno, Arawak, Kalinago/Carib, and the Ciboney people. Several of them lived in present-day Charlotte Amalie in small fishing communities. As was the case in most of the Americas, the native population died relatively quickly from disease when the Europeans settled. As the Spanish early focused their energy on Puerto Rico and other Caribbean islands, Saint Thomas remained unprotected for a long time, leaving Charlotte Amalie's sheltered coves to be frequented by pirates, like Blackbeard, as well as mariners and European settlers.

17th century
The Danish West India Company chartered Charlotte Amalie in 1671 after King Christian V decided to secure them for plantations. As early as in 1672, the Danish government began the construction of Fort Christian on Saint Thomas Harbor in Charlotte Amalie. In 1675, the Danes constructed four pubs near the water's edge on the western side of the Fort. The Danish government supplied convicts to work the plantations but soon allowed colonists from neighboring islands to settle there, as well as to permit the importation of slaves from Africa. In 1680, there were more black African slaves than white European settlers. Adjacent Water and Buck Islands served as pasture lands for the City, and Taphus was renamed Charlotte Amalie in 1691 after King Christian V's wife. It was the main port of the Virgin Islands Archipelago and was connected to about 50 plantations by one road, which remains the main highway today.

18th century
In the early 18th century, more than 3000 white settlers lived in Town, and sugar production and slave trading were the economic mainstay. After the Danish government wanted direct administration of the archipelago in 1754, the capital was moved from Charlotte Amalie to Christiansted on the Island of Saint Croix. That partly made the economy in Town to transition from slave trading and agriculture to general commerce. The slight couldn't hamper the city's growth, as merchants profiteered in arms and rum trades to belligerent countries.

In 1764, Charlotte Amalie was declared a free port by King Frederick V, and the Town became the busiest harbor in the Caribbean. The American Revolution in the 1770s was good news for the city, as it was thriving times for the local businessfolk.  The Town began to be filled by immigrants from Europe, Africa and the Caribbean, most of them from other islands of the Lesser Antilles. By 1778, the Danish government had strengthened their military position by building Bluebeard's Castle and Blackbeard's Castle, lookout towers on the crests of the two hills by the city. The city prospered as a free port and United States, Danish, Sephardic, German, French, British, Italian and Spanish importing houses operated here. At the end of the 18th century, United States founding father and future architect of the United States Constitution, Alexander Hamilton, decided the Town was so wealthy that "gold moved through the streets in wheel-barrows". At one point, the city of Charlotte Amalie in the Danish West Indies was the second-largest city in the Danish Realm, only smaller than the capital of Copenhagen.

19th century
A growing share of the West Indian trade passed through the port in the beginning of the 1800s, and the rise of steamships made Charlotte Amalie an ideal coaling station for ships sailing between North- and South America.
In 1804, Charlotte Amalie was struck by a horrendous fire that destroyed more than 1200 homes and stores throughout the town. Two more fires came in 1805 and 1806, and the densely settled town lost another thousand buildings. Neighboring islands gradually began importing coal directly from producers, and Charlotte Amalie was sidestepped in trade in the early 1800s. The abolition of slavery in 1848 further diminished Charlotte Amalie's commercial role and the town suffered from a brutal recession, as did most of the Caribbean following abolition.

During the American Civil War in the early 1860s, the town evolved into a smuggling center for ships running the federal blockade of ports in the Confederacy. As an acknowledgment of the port's smuggling success, the Danish government decided to move the capital of the archipelago back to Charlotte Amalie in 1871. The latter half of the 1800s was also soon hit by a cholera epidemic that killed thousands. Charlotte Amalie fell into an unsuccessful dormancy until the United States decided to buy the islands from Denmark in 1917.

20th century
In 1915, the United States became interested in buying the U.S. Virgin Islands. They were concerned over German infiltration in the Lesser Antilles. The U.S. purchased the Danish West Indies in 1917 for $25 million. Charlotte Amalie was under U.S. Navy rule until 1931. The United States decided to make Charlotte Amalie the main headquarters of the renamed United States Virgin Islands.

When American tourists were barred from Cuba in 1960, some began visiting Charlotte Amalie instead. As an unincorporated territory of the United States, it's been a haven for mainland United States citizens seeking luxury vacations or a second home in the Caribbean. During the mid 20th century, resorts began to be built and direct flights from the U.S. to Charlotte Amalie increased tourism. During the last half of the century, Charlotte Amalie experienced extraordinary economic growth, largely as a consequence of being a U.S. territory with a growing U.S. tourism. The tourism has not only led to a growing economy, but also to preservation and conversion of historic buildings and homes. Many ancient commercial buildings were made into restaurants and shops. During the 1980s and 90s, many buildings were restored to how they looked 200 years ago.

The tourist industry has thrived on the Island. Tourism in the Town now drives the economy of the U.S. Virgin Islands, but limited flatlands in the mountainous terrain will constrain Charlotte Amalie's economic and population growth. The spread of hilltop homes overlooking the Caribbean crystal blue waters began trending in the 1960s as well.

Geography 

Located mid-island on the south shore of the mountainous Island of Saint Thomas, Charlotte Amalie stretches about 1.5 miles around Saint Thomas Harbor from the Havensight district where the cruise ships dock in the east, to Frenchtown and the Sub Base neighborhoods on the west. The red walls of the Danish Fort Christian and the open space of Emancipation Garden and the Vendor's Market are the center of Old Town. Many of the City's historic buildings and businesses stand on the slopes of Government Hill just north of Emancipation Garden. This is "Kongens Quarter". To the west, spanning the area between Waterfront Dr and Dronningens Gade (Main Street), are a score of alleys, each lined with colonial warehouse buildings that have been turned into stores and urban malls. Protected by the peaks of Water Island and Hassel Island, Saint Thomas Harbor makes a deep indentation in the Island.

Charlotte Amalie is built on three low volcanic spurs called Frenchman Hill (Foretop Hill), Berg Hill (Maintop), and Government Hill (Mizzentop). Charlotte Amalie is located at coordinates 18°21' north and 64°57' west.

Climate 
The city has a short dry season that runs from January through March and a wet season that covers the remaining nine months, though technically June, with a monthly average precipitation of  could be considered a dry season month. While Charlotte Amalie does have a lengthy wet season, outside the months of September through November, the city generally does not see the heavy precipitation that is prevalent in many other cities with a tropical climate. The City is generally very warm and humid.

Population

Demographics 
The 2010 United States Census reported that Charlotte Amalie had a population of 18,481.

A 76.2% majority are Afro-Caribbean, while a minority of 13.1% are white. About one percent is of Asian descent.

Religion 
According to the CIA World Factbook, more than 95 percent of the people describe themselves as Christians. 42% are Baptist, 34% Catholic and 17% Episcopalian. There are also Jewish, Hindu and Muslim populations of European, Middle Eastern and Caribbean origin.

The city's Saints Peter and Paul Cathedral is the episcopal see of the Roman Catholic Diocese of Saint Thomas, which covers the American Virgin Islands and is the sole suffragan of the Metropolitan Archdiocese of Washington (D.C.).

Saint Thomas is home to one of the oldest Jewish communities in the Western Hemisphere as Sephardic Jews began to settle the island in the 18th century as traders and merchants. The St. Thomas Synagogue in Charlotte Amalie is the second oldest synagogue in the United States.

Languages and literacy 
More than 95 percent of the population are literate.

Although English is the official language, most people speak a dialect called Virgin Islands Creole, which differs from standard English in many ways. Virgin Islands Creole is used informally and standard United States English (spoken with a uniquely Virgin Islands accent) is usually preferred in school, at work and in more formal conversations. Most older children and adults can quickly switch between Virgin Islands Creole and United States English. Spanish is spoken by 16.8% and French Patois is spoken by 6.6% of the city's population. While Spanish is spoken by migrants from Puerto Rico (US) and immigrants from the Dominican Republic, creoles are spoken by immigrants from St. Barthelemy, Dominica and Haiti; Dutch and Papiamento are spoken by immigrants from Saba, Aruba, St. Maarten and Curacao.

Economy 

The economy is based on tourism, handicrafts, jewelry, and the production of rum, bay rum, and jams. As well as being the USVI's political capital, the city is the port capital of the U.S. Virgin Islands. Charlotte Amalie is the third most popular cruise ship destination in the Caribbean Sea. Up to eleven cruise ships can occupy the harbor on any given day, though usually there are about five.

Tourism
About 1.5 plus million cruise ship passengers visit on average per year.

Tourist attractions include Blackbeard's Castle which is one of the most visited attractions in the Town, Bluebeard's Castle, 17th-century Fort Christian, the green and distinctive Legislature Building, the 99 Steps Stairway, Emancipation Garden, Market Square, Seven Arches Museum, St. Thomas Synagogue, Frederick Lutheran Church, and the Weibel Museum. In the 21st century, Charlotte Amalie has benefited from proximity to San Juan, Puerto Rico, where passengers from larger aircraft can transfer to smaller aircraft for a 30-minute flight to Charlotte Amalie. The City has also become a jumping-off place for other islands in the U.S. and British Virgin Islands. In this century, there have been more high-speed ferries each year leaving Charlotte Amalie for St. Croix, St. John and Tortola. A seaplane wharf is near the west end of the inner harbor; the planes take passengers to St. Croix.

Because of its duty-free policies, the Territory is sometimes referred to as "the duty-free capital of the world". Charlotte Amalie has more jewelry shops and perfume vendors than anywhere else in the Caribbean and is known for its outdoor shopping Vendors' Plaza. On Main Street (Dronningens Gade) there are many major shops, including Tiffany, Breitling, Rolex, and Fresh Produce.

Havensight and Crown Bay docks are other shopping areas, with a number of stores adjacent to the cruise ship docks. Along Dronningens Gade are more than 400 shops, most of them selling jewelry and in the Havensight Mall. The western end (near the intersection with Strand Gade) is called "Market Square." Once the site of the biggest slave market auctions in the Caribbean Basin, today it is an open-air cluster of stalls where resident farmers and gardeners gather occasionally to sell their produce.

Culture 

The culture is a mixture of American (US) socio-economic activities- and Afro/Latino-Caribbean culture, with an influence from Danish colonial history. There are American fast food chains in the City, as well as local restaurants serving only Caribbean cuisine. Grocery stores contain items from the US mainland, and local items such as rum. Seafood and local produce can be found at open-air markets.

Danish influence 
Named Charlotte Amalie in honor of the wife of Danish King Christian V, the Danish influence is strong. The heritage is predominant in several ways in Charlotte Amalie today. The Danes left castles, cemeteries, churches, forts, town homes, sugar mills and plantation houses that are still standing. Many geographical names are kept in Danish and many locals have Danish heritage. The most widely spoken language, Virgin Islands Creole, has many words and expressions left from the Danish language. For instance, Danish words like "skål" (toast), "berg" (mountain) and "frikadeller" (meatballs) are commonly used. Much of the historic colonial architecture is still standing and words like "street" are more commonly referred to by the Danish translation "gade".

Charlotte Amalie has the largest collection of colonial buildings in the Caribbean. Most of the buildings are classic Caribbean adaptions of English Georgian architecture built by the Danes, dating to the 1830s.

Sport 

C.A.H.S. Stadium

Transportation 

There are three main roads in Charlotte Amalie. Waterfront Drive, also called Veteran's Drive, fronts the harbor and extends from Havensight Mall to Frenchtown. This four-lane road is best navigated by car or taxi. Main Street, also called Dronningen's Gade and Norre Gade, run parallel to the waterfront. Back Street, also called Wimmelskafts Gade, is one block farther inland, parallel to the shoreline. Street names in the Town are remnants of the Island's Danish past.

Charlotte Amalie is notable for being the only U.S. capital city (either of a territory or state) where traffic drives on the left side of the road – this despite a previous fourteen-year period of attempting to conform to the United States' right side principle, which was abandoned and reverted to left side by popular demand. The United States Virgin Islands (USVI) is the only United States jurisdiction of any kind where the rule of the road is to drive on the left. However, virtually all passenger vehicles are left hand drive due to imports of U.S. vehicles. making the driving experience in the USVI very similar to the situation in The Bahamas, and for largely the same vehicle import reasons.

Highway 30 (Veterans Drive) passes through Charlotte Amalie. Additionally, Charlotte Amalie holds one of the two airports in the US Virgin Islands. Cyril E. King Airport (IATA: STT ICAO: TIST) offers regular nonstop service to destinations to Atlanta, Chicago and along the east coast of the United States.

Education 
St. Thomas-St. John School District serves the community. Addelita Cancryn Junior High School and Charlotte Amalie High School serve the area. The University of the Virgin Islands, located in Charlotte Amalie, was founded in 1962.

Notable people 

 Alton Adams − Lyrics writer of the Virgin Islands National Anthem and first band master of Afro-Caribbean heritage for the United States Navy
 Edward Wilmot Blyden − ambassador and is credited by some as having laid the foundation of West African nationalism or Pan-Africanism
 Callix Crabbe − Major League Baseball player
 Hannah Davis − fashion model
 Kelsey Grammer − actor, director and producer
 Emile Griffith − boxer who won world championships in the Welterweight and Middleweight divisions
 Alexander Hamilton −  born in neighboring island of Nevis; moved to the Danish West Indies (present-day U.S. Virgin Islands), where he grew up
 Elrod Hendricks − Major League Baseball player
 Julian Jackson − boxer
 J. Raymond Jones − political activist
 Al McBean − Major League Baseball player
 Alonzo G. Morón (1909–1971), university president, educator, and civil servant; born in Charlotte Amalie, Danish West Indies (present-day U.S. Virgin Islands)
 Ralph Moses Paiewonsky − governor
 Calvin Pickering −  Major League Baseball player
 Jasmin St. Claire − former pornographic actress
 Charles Sainte-Claire Deville − French geologist
 Henri Sainte-Claire Deville − French chemist
 Camille Pissarro − a key member of the French Impressionist painters
 Rashawn Ross − trumpeter who tours with Dave Matthews Band
 Roy Lester Schneider − governor and physician
 Morris Simmonds − German physician and pathologist
 Karrine Steffans − New York Times best-selling author
 Terence Todman − ambassador
 Denmark Vesey − leader of planned slave uprising in Charleston, South Carolina
 Peter von Scholten − governor general
 David Levy Yulee − first Jewish member of the United States Senate

Gallery

References

External links
 

Capitals in North America
Capitals of political divisions in the United States
Capitals in the Caribbean
Port cities in the Caribbean
Populated places in Saint Thomas, U.S. Virgin Islands
Populated places established in 1666
1666 establishments in North America
Towns in the United States Virgin Islands